HD 100307 is a suspected variable star in the constellation of Hydra. Its apparent magnitude is 6.16, but interstellar dust makes it appear 0.346 magnitudes dimmer than it should be. It is located some 340 light-years (104 parsecs) away, based on parallax.

HD 100307 is a M-type red giant. It has evolved from the main sequence to a radius of 67.6 times that of the Sun. It emits 687 times as much energy as the Sun at a surface temperature of 3,598 K.

References

Hydra (constellation)
M-type giants
Durchmusterung objects
100307
056293
4445